Freckle Films is an American film and television production company. It is owned by Jessica Chastain.

History
In February 2016, it was reported that Chastain had launched her company. In May 2017, Kelly Carmichael became a president of production and development. Carmichael, who had previously worked at Miramax and at The Weinstein Company as a production executive.

In 2018, Chastain and a group of international actresses travelled to Cannes Film Festival to pitch an all female ensemble spy film, The 355. Universal Pictures acquired the rights to the film at $20 million. It was released on January 7, 2022. Their first film, Ava, was released on September 25, 2020.

In Autumn 2022, the company entered production on The Eyes of Tammy Faye, starring Chastain and Andrew Garfield. The film was released on September 17, 2021. It went on to win several awards including: Screen Actor Guild Award for Outstanding Performance by a Female Actor, BAFTA Award for Best Makeup & Hair, Critics Choice Award for Best Actress & Best Makeup, Academy Award for Best Actress in a Leading Role & Best Makeup & Hair. In 2022, the company purchased the rights to adapt the novel The School for Good Mothers as a television series.

Filmography

Films

Television series

Upcoming projects
The Division

References

External links
 

Mass media companies established in 2016
Film production companies of the United States
2016 establishments in New York City